The Eurotransplant International Foundation, commonly known simply as Eurotransplant, is an international non-profit organization responsible for encouraging and coordinating organ transplants in Austria, Belgium, Croatia, Germany, Hungary, Luxembourg, Netherlands, and Slovenia. The organization was created by Jon J. van Rood in 1967 and legally founded on 12 May 1969. The headquarters are located in Leiden, Netherlands.

All transplant clinics, tissue-typing laboratories, and hospitals in the member countries where organ donations take place are included in the exchange. Eurotransplant helps coordinate work in these institutions, with the goal of efficiently allocating and distributing donated organs. The group also promotes research into transplantation and seeks to raise public awareness of the benefits of donation.

In 2016 and 2017 Croatia had the highest donor rate among the countries members of the Eurotransplant, 35.8 and 31.8 respectively per million people in the population.

Comparable institutions are Scandiatransplant in Iceland, Norway, Finland, Denmark, and Sweden; as well as Balttransplant in Estonia, Latvia, and Lithuania.

References

External links
 

European medical and health organizations
Leiden
Organisations based in South Holland
Organizations established in 1969
Transplantation medicine